Fundata may refer to the following places in Romania:

Fundata, a commune in Brașov County
Fundata, a village in the commune Lopătari, Buzău County
Fundata, a village in the commune Perieți, Ialomița County
Fundáta, the Hungarian name for the village Valea in the commune Urmeniș, Bistrița-Năsăud County
Fundata (river), a tributary of the Ialomița in Ialomița County